Usher Morgan (born May 23, 1985) is a screenwriter, film director, producer, author and entrepreneur based in New York City. He is best known as the writer, director, and producer of films such as Prego and Pickings.

Personal life and career

Morgan was born in Israel and immigrated to the United States in his early twenties. He founded companies in the publishing, real estate and film production industries. After experimenting with film production and distribution, Morgan began showing interest in producing and directing his own films. His first film was a documentary entitled The Thought Exchange, starring David Friedman and Lucie Arnaz, it was released in New York City in 2012.

Morgan's first narrative directorial debut, a comedy short film entitled Prego was written with the help of Seinfeld writer Andy Cowan. It won the Best Comedy Short Award at the 2015 Manhattan Film Festival, Best Comedy Short Award at the 2015 Chain NYC Film Festival, 2 awards from the 2015 Indie Fest Film Festival, and the Best Comedy award at the 2015 Trinity International Film Festival. Morgan's first feature film, Pickings was filmed in New York City in 2016 and was released to U.S. theaters in 2018. Morgan's directing style is influenced primarily by film-noir and spaghetti westerns.

In 2018, Morgan wrote and published Lessons from the Set: A DIY Guide to Your First Feature Film, from Script to Theaters detailing his experience in writing, directing, and distributing his debut film.

In April 2021, Morgan announced his 2nd feature film, The Thing with Feathers, which he co-wrote and plans to co-direct and co-produce with Katie Vincent.

Filmography
 The Jerk (2011)
 Worth Fighting For (2011)
 The Thought Exchange (2012)
 Crowned (2013)
 Good Kids (2014)
 Prego (2015)
 Fine Dining (2017)
 Pickings (2018)
 Trapped Inside (2019)
 Windblown (2020)
 The Last Frost (2021)
 Dual Action (2021)
 Homebound (2021)
 The Thing with Feathers (TBD)
 Journey Into Night'' (TBD)

References

External links

Film producers from New York (state)
Living people
People from Yokneam Illit
American book publishers (people)
1985 births
New York City